The 1978 ICF Canoe Sprint World Championships were held in Belgrade, Yugoslavia for a record third time. The Yugoslavian (now Serbian) city had previously hosted the championships in 1971 and 1975.

The men's competition consisted of six Canadian (single paddle, open boat) and nine kayak events. Three events were held for the women, all in kayak.

This was the fourteenth championships in canoe sprint.

Medal summary

Men's

Canoe

Kayak

Women's

Kayak

Medals table

References
ICF medalists for Olympic and World Championships - Part 1: flatwater (now sprint): 1936-2007.
ICF medalists for Olympic and World Championships - Part 2: rest of flatwater (now sprint) and remaining canoeing disciplines: 1936-2007.

Icf Canoe Sprint World Championships, 1978
Icf Canoe Sprint World Championships, 1978
ICF Canoe Sprint World Championships
International sports competitions hosted by Yugoslavia
Canoeing and kayaking competitions in Yugoslavia